Edward Croft (died 1601), of Croft Castle, Herefordshire, was an English politician.

He was a Member (MP) of the Parliament of England for Leominster in 1571, 1584 and 1586.

References

16th-century births
1601 deaths
People from Herefordshire
English MPs 1571
English MPs 1584–1585
English MPs 1586–1587